Weymouth is a rural locality in the local government area (LGA) of George Town in the Launceston LGA region of Tasmania. The 2016 census has a population of 129 for the state suburb of Weymouth.
It is a small township in northern Tasmania, on the Pipers River opposite Bellingham and about 60 km from Launceston. It has a very small permanent population; however, it attracts many visitors during the summer months. Weymouth has a beach, a tennis court, and a community hall with a playground.

The beaches of Weymouth are known for lapidary specimens of agate and chalcedony, and a section of the beach is a designated fossicking area, according to Mineral Resources Tasmania.

History
Weymouth was gazetted as a locality in 1960.
Back Creek Post Office opened on 1 June 1870 and was replaced by the Weymouth office in 1959. This closed in 1977.

Geography
The waters of Bass Strait form most of the northern boundary, and Pipers River the eastern.

Road infrastructure
Route C816 (Weymouth Road) enters from the south and runs through to the village in the north-east, where it ends. Route C817 (Tam O’Shanter Road) starts from an intersection with C816 and runs north until it exits.

References

Towns in Tasmania
Localities of George Town Council